Eino Artturi Koskinen (9 June 1904, in Karstula – 19 May 1981) was a Finnish smallholder and politician. He was a member of the Parliament of Finland from 1948 to 1958 and again from 1962 to 1970, representing the Social Democratic Party of Finland (SDP).

References

1904 births
1981 deaths
People from Karstula
People from Vaasa Province (Grand Duchy of Finland)
Social Democratic Party of Finland politicians
Members of the Parliament of Finland (1948–51)
Members of the Parliament of Finland (1951–54)
Members of the Parliament of Finland (1954–58)
Members of the Parliament of Finland (1962–66)
Members of the Parliament of Finland (1966–70)